Supriya Shrinate (born 27 October 1977), also known as Supriya Srinet,  is an Indian politician and former journalist, who currently serves as a National Spokesperson for the Indian National Congress. She contested the 2019 Indian general election (Lok Sabha election) from Maharajganj constituency.

Shrinate worked for 18 years as a journalist. She began her career with India Today, later she joined NDTV as an assistant editor.  She was working as an executive editor in ET Now of The Times Group when she joined active politics.

Early life 
Shrinate is the daughter of former MP Harsh Vardhan. She was educated at the Loreto Convent Lucknow. She graduated with a Master of Arts in History from the University of Delhi.

Journalism 
Shrinate worked for 18 years as a journalist in the print and electronic media. In 2001, she began her career with India Today (TV channel) as a special correspondent. In 2004, she joined NDTV as an assistant editor. In 2008, she joined ET Now as chief editor – news. She was named policy editor and executive editor for ET Now the same year.

Politics 
In 2019, she resigned from her post as a executive editor in ET Now to contest 2019 Indian general election. She contested the Maharajganj constituency as an Indian National Congress candidate and lost to Pankaj Choudhary of BJP, coming in third with 72,516 votes and 5.91% of the vote.

In 2019, she was appointed as the spokesperson of All India Congress Committee.
She participated in TV debates as Congress spokesperson.

She also participated in UP Assembly Elections 2022 as star campaigner of Indian National Congress.

In 2022, Supriya Shrinate was appointed as Chairman of Social Media & Digital Platforms of Indian National Congress.

References

External links
 Keynote by Supriya Shrinate, Chief Editor-News, ET Now at Institute for Competitiveness, India part of the Institute for Strategy and Competitiveness at Harvard Business School.

Living people
Indian National Congress politicians
People from Maharajganj district
NDTV people
ET Now people
India Today people
21st-century Indian women politicians
Indian women journalists
Delhi University alumni
1977 births